Kosmos 1172 ( meaning Cosmos 1172) was a Soviet US-K missile early warning satellite which was launched in 1980 as part of the Soviet military's Oko programme. The satellite was designed to identify missile launches using optical telescopes and infrared sensors.

Kosmos 1172 was launched from Site 41/1 at Plesetsk Cosmodrome in the Russian SSR. A Molniya-M carrier rocket with a 2BL upper stage was used to perform the launch, which took place at 20:18 UTC on 12 April 1980. The launch successfully placed the satellite into a molniya orbit. It subsequently received its Kosmos designation, and the international designator 1980-028A. The United States Space Command assigned it the Satellite Catalog Number 11758.

It re-entered the Earth's atmosphere on 26 December 1997.

See also

 1980 in spaceflight
 List of Kosmos satellites (1001–1250)
 List of Oko satellites
 List of R-7 launches (1980-1984)

References

Kosmos satellites
Spacecraft launched in 1980
Oko
Spacecraft launched by Molniya-M rockets
Spacecraft which reentered in 1997